Clare Burson is an American indie folk singer-songwriter. She has released four albums. Since 2003, Burson has released four studio albums.

Early life and education
Burson was born in Memphis, Tennessee. She is a classically-trained violinist. After graduating from Brown University, she studied Identity Politics and The Holocaust in Germany on a Fulbright Scholarship.

Music career
Burson's 2010 release Silver and Ash was released by Rounder Records, and produced by Tucker Martine. The content of the album is based on Burson's research on her family's life in Nazi Germany. She won a grant from Six Points Fellowship for Emerging Jewish Artist to write an album with Jewish themes.

Discography

References

External links
 Official website
 
 Video: Interview with Clare Burson

Living people
Musicians from Memphis, Tennessee
Musicians from Brooklyn
Brown University alumni
Musicians from Nashville, Tennessee
American alternative country singers
Year of birth missing (living people)
Singer-songwriters from New York (state)
Singer-songwriters from Tennessee
Country musicians from New York (state)
Country musicians from Tennessee